Pe Tin (also spelt Phay Tin; born 16 September 1947) is a Burmese politician and former political prisoner, currently serving as an Amyotha Hluttaw MP for Mon State No. 6 Constituency. He is a member of the National League for Democracy politician.

Early life and education
Pe Tin was born on 16 September 1947 in Mudon, Mon State, Myanmar. In 1980, he was a senior lawyer succeeded exam. He was the chairman of Mudon Township National League for Democracy until today from 1988. In July 1997, Under Section 8, the executive 8 members was 6 months of imprisonment.

Political career
He is a member of the National League for Democracy Party politician. In the 2015 Myanmar general election, he was elected as Amyotha Hluttaw representative for Mon State Mon State No. 6 parliamentary constituency.

References

Members of the House of Nationalities
National League for Democracy politicians
1947 births
Living people
People from Mon State